The Marc Fitch Lectures are a series of lectures first started in 1956 by Marc Fitch, historian and philanthropist.

History
The lectures were started by Marc Fitch in 1956, and are funded by the Marc Fitch Fund, an educational charity also set up in 1956.

The lectures were held at the Institute of Historical Research until 2012, when the series moved to a tour of the counties with three held a year.

Previous Lectures

 1 February 2005 – Roy Strong – "Forgotten faces: regional history and regional portraiture"
 6 July 2009 – John Morrill – "The British Revolution in the English Provinces, 1640–9" 
 2010 – Steve Hindle – "Below stairs at Arbury Hall: Sir Richard Newdigate and his household staff, c.1670–1710"
 2011 – Jeremy Black – "London History"
 25 June 2012 – David Starkey – "Head of Our Morality: why the twentieth-century British monarchy matters"
 18 May 2013 – Tristram Hunt – "Aristocracy and Industry: the Sutherlands in Staffordshire"
 25 October 2013 – Christopher Dyer – "Corby, Northamptonshire and Beyond: The History of Industry in the Countryside"
 12 April 2014 – David Hey – "The Origins and Spread of Derbyshire Surnames"
 24 October 2014 – Trevor Rowley – "The Making of the Shropshire Landscape"
 14 November 2015 – Chris Mullin – "Changing Face of Sunderland"

References

British lecture series
Geography education in the United Kingdom
History education
Recurring events established in 1956

1956 establishments in the United Kingdom